Amell is a surname. Notable people with the surname include:

Robbie Amell (born 1988), Canadian actor and model
Stephen Amell (born 1981), Canadian actor